This is list of symbols and emblems of the U.S. state of Colorado.


Insignia

Living symbols

Earth symbols

Cultural symbols

Highway route markers

Motor vehicle license plates

Naval vessel

United States coin

See also

Colorado
Bibliography of Colorado
Index of Colorado-related articles
Outline of Colorado

References

External links

Colorado state government website
Symbols and Emblems of Colorado

 
Colorado-related lists
Colorado state symbols, List of